Mr. America is a 2013 Italian thriller directed by Leonardo Ferrari Carissimi, and screenplay by the director himself and Fabio Morgan. It stars Anna Favella and Marco Cocci.

Plot
Penny Morningstar (Anna Favella) is a young and successful art gallery director, while Andy is a failed artist, obsessed with Andy Warhol. 
Andy Warhol was a serial killer, without piety, who stole people's soul, letting them die slowly. Valerie Solanas, Edie Sedgwick or Jean-Michel Basquiat would probably share this theory, but they cannot do it, because they are all dead. These are not the only suicides connected to the controversial figure of Andy Warhol, or as David Solanas called him, "Mr. America". 
In the movie Penny is a sort of Andy Warhol. She's beautiful and talented, but she's also evil. When she wants to do something she doesn't care if she hurts people. Every artist of the gallery is in love with her and she will destroy them. Then there's a killer, who thinks to be Andy Warhol and kills all the artists who compose Penny Morningstar's factory.

Cast
 Anna Favella as Penelope (Penny) Morningstar
 Marco Cocci as Adrian 
 Eliud Luciani as Nathan Briac
 Luca Mannocci as Seven
 Michael Schermi as Roy

Premiere
The film premiered on October 17, 2013, in Trento and the press conference and other official premiere was in Rome, on November 5, 2013. The movie has been released in all the cinemas on November 7, 2013.

Accolades

2013 films
2010s Italian-language films